India is participating in Lusofonia Games since inaugural Games of 2006. India is an associate member of ACOLOP, the governing body of the games.

Overall medal table by Games

Overall Medal Table by Sport

See also
India at the Olympics
India at the Paralympics
India at the World Games
India at the Asian Games
India at the Commonwealth Games
India at the South Asian Games

References

Nations at the Lusofonia Games